is a national highway of Japan connecting Ōita, Ōita and Nagasaki, Nagasaki in Japan.

Route description
Length: 326.7 km (203.0 mi)
Origin: Oita, Oita (junction with Route 10 and terminates at Route 210)
Terminus: Nagasaki, Nagasaki (terminates at Route 34 and Route 202)
Major cities: Oita, Taketa, Kumamoto, Uki, Shimabara, Isahaya, Nagasaki

A section of National Route 57 in the city of Taketa in Ōita Prefecture is a musical road.

History
1953-05-18 - Second Class National Highway 214 (from Isahaya to Shimabara), Second Class National Highway 215 (from Shimabara to Uto) and Second Class National Highway 216 (from Kumamoto to Oita) 
1963-04-01 - Joined Second Class National Highways 214, 215 and 216 to form First Class National Highway 57 (from Oita to Nagasaki)
1965-04-01 -  General National Highway 57 (from Oita to Nagasaki)

Overlapping sections
From Oita (Omichi Entrance intersection) to Bungo-ono Inukai Bypass junction: Route 10
From Oita (Funai Bridge North intersection) to Oita (Miyazaki intersection): Route 210
From Taketa (Aiai-Shichiri intersection) to Taketa (Aiai-Hira intersection): Route 442
From Aso Ichinomiya-machi Sakanashi (Sakanashi intersection) to Aso Kurokawa (Uchinomaki Onsen Entrance intersection): Route 265
From Minamiaso (Aso Bridge intersection) to Ōzu (Muro intersection): Route 325
From Minami-ku, Kumamoto (Chikami-machi intersection) to Uto (Matsuwara intersection): Route 3
From Uki Misumi-machi Misumiura (Gokyō Entrance intersection) to Uki Misumi-machi Misumiura (Misumi Port intersection): Route 266
From Shimabara Minato-machi (Shimabara Gaikō intersection) to Shimabara Shinwa-machi (Unzen Higashi Tozanguchi intersection): Route 251
From Unzen Obama-cho Obama to Unzen Obama-cho Minamikisashi: Route 389
From Unzen Obama-cho Marina (Unzen Nishi Tozanguchi intersection) to Unzen Aino-machi Otsu (Aino Tenbōdai-mae intersection): Route 251
From Unzen Aino-machi (Aino intersection) to Isahaya: Route 251
From Isahaya (Obunakoshi-machi intersection) to Isahaya Tarami-chō Geya (Kikitsu Station East Entrance intersection): Route 207
From Isahaya (Obunakoshi Tunnel intersection) to Nagasaki (Kenchōmae intersection): Route 34
From Nagasaki (Yagami-machi intersection) to Nagasaki (Kenchōmae intersection): Route 251

Municipalities passed through
Oita Prefecture 
Oita - Bungo-ono - Taketa
Kumamoto Prefecture 
Aso - Minamiaso - Ōzu - Kikuyo - Kumamoto - Uto - Uki
Nagasaki Prefecture 
Shimabara - Minamishimabara - Unzen - Isahaya - Nagasaki

References

057
Roads in Kumamoto Prefecture
Roads in Nagasaki Prefecture
Roads in Ōita Prefecture
Musical roads in Japan